Konstantinos Maniadakis (July 25, 1893 in Sofiko, Corinthia – February 28, 1972 in Athens) was a Greek Army officer and politician who became notorious as head of the internal security services of the dictatorial 4th of August Regime (1936–1941). A career engineers officer, Maniadakis resigned from the army in 1929. In 1936, dictator Ioannis Metaxas appointed him to head the Under-Ministry of Public Security. During his tenure, he managed to almost completely suppress and disorganize the Communist Party of Greece, imprisoning hundreds of its members and even publishing a government-controlled rival version of the party's newspaper, Rizospastis. Maniadakis as a Security Minister was regarded to be highly efficient against Communist policies in Greece. Following the German invasion of Greece, he continued in office in the early months of the Greek government in exile as Interior Minister, but was soon forced to resign. After World War II, he was elected several times to the Hellenic Parliament.

References

External links 
 Konstantinos Maniadakis, a biography of Konstantinos Maniadakis

Ministers of the Interior of Greece
Hellenic Army officers
4th of August Regime
1893 births
1972 deaths
National Radical Union politicians
Politically Independent Alignment politicians
Ioannis Metaxas
Greek MPs 1950–1951
Greek MPs 1958–1961
Greek MPs 1961–1963
Greek MPs 1964–1967
Greek fascists
People from Corinthia
Political repression in Greece